The Legislature of Salta Province is the legislature of Salta, one of the twenty three provinces that make up Argentina. It is a bicameral body, comprising the Chamber of Deputies (made up of 60 representatives), and the Senate (with 23 representatives).

It is one of eight bicameral legislatures in the country. Senators are elected using the first-past-the-post (FPTP) system, with each senator representing one of Salta's 23 departments, while deputies are elected by a mixed FPTP / proportional representation system, wherein the most populous departments are allocated more seats, while the smallest departments elect a single deputy. Members of both houses are elected for four-year terms, and, as in the National Chamber of Deputies and most other provincial legislatures, elections are held every two years, so that half of its members are up in each election.

Both houses of the Legislature convene in the Legislative Palace, in the provincial capital of Salta. The building, a city landmark, is of an Italian academic style. Its construction began in 1892 and extended until 1902.

See also

 List of provincial legislatures in Argentina
 National Congress of Argentina
 Argentine Senate
 Argentine Chamber of Deputies

Notes

References

 
Bicameral legislatures
Government of Argentina
Salta Province
Salta